Berkeley Research Group, LLC (BRG) is a global consulting firm that helps organizations with assistance in disputes and investigations, corporate finance, and performance improvement and advisory. BRG is headquartered in Emeryville, California, with offices across the United States and in Asia, Australia, Canada, Latin America, the Middle East and the United Kingdom. As of January 2023, it has more than 1,300 employees across more than forty offices.

History
BRG was co-founded in February 2010 by a group including Dr. David Teece, who has served as its Chairman and principal executive officer.

BRG provides economic, financial, and analytical advice for a range of disciplines, including antitrust and competition policy, class action certification, construction, corporate governance, damages analysis, energy, environment and natural resources, finance and valuation, financial reporting evaluation and fraud, forensic financial investigations, health analytics, information technology, insurance and reinsurance, intellectual property, international and domestic arbitration, labor and employment, public policy, and security issues. It also advises clients in industry sectors with compliance, business process improvement, and strategy consulting. Major practice areas include:

BRG offers healthcare and life sciences industry expertise. In January 2011, the California Institute for Regenerative Medicine (CIRM), a state agency created by voters with Proposition 71, the California Stem Cell Research and Cures Act, released an independent economic impact study authored by BRG professionals. The report showed that the first $1.1 billion in grants created 25,000 job years and $200 million in new tax revenue through 2014. Taxpayer funding generates 2,739 jobs annually.

Special Advisor Dr. Laura D'Andrea Tyson and directors Dr. Kenneth Serwin and Dr. Eric Drabkin performed "The Benefits for the U.S. Economy of a Temporary Tax Reduction on the Repatriation of Foreign Subsidiary Earnings," a 2011 economic study commissioned by the New America Foundation. The study assessed the effects of a one-time reduction in the tax rate applied to the repatriation of foreign subsidiary earnings on spending, output, and employment in the U.S. economy. The study found that a temporary reduction to approximately 5.25 percent would lead to a significant increase in repatriations, making $942 billion available for domestic use by U.S. multinational corporations. In 2013, the same authors published "Implications of a Switch to a Territorial Tax System in the United States: A Critical Comparison to the Current System." Citizens for Tax Justice wrote that the study "flies in the face of overwhelming evidence that today many of these profits are really earned in the U.S. but characterized as 'offshore' in order to obtain existing tax benefits that would be expanded under a territorial system."

BRG publishes the publications BRG Review and ThinkSet which contain articles by BRG staff.

Global Competition Review ranked BRG among the top 20 competition economics firms in the world in Economics 20, GCR's assessment of the world's leading economic consultancies, in both 2012 and 2013, and in its top 21 for 2014, 2015, and 2017. Global Investigations Review named BRG as one of the top ten investigations consultancies in the GIR 100 2018 guide.

Reception
Charles H. Ferguson, author of Predator Nation: Corporate Criminals, Political Corruption, and the Hijacking of America, criticized Berkeley Research Group for focusing primarily "on helping companies avoid or influence legislation, public debate, regulation, prosecution, class-action lawsuits, antitrust judgments, and taxes."

See also
Analysis Group
Bates White
Brattle Group
Charles River Associates
Compass Lexecon
Cornerstone Research
NERA Economic Consulting

References

External links

BRG Review
ThinkSet

Connectivity Scorecard
Economic Recovery Advisory Board – Laura Tyson

2010 establishments in California
Companies based in Emeryville, California
International management consulting firms
Management consulting firms of the United States